Halal Love Story is a  2020 Malayalam-language comedy drama film directed by Zakariya Mohammed. The movie is scripted jointly by Zakariya and Muhsin Parari, with Ashif Kakkodi credited as co-writer. The film is bankrolled by Aashiq Abu under the banner OPM Cinemas, Jesna Ashim and Harshad Ali under Papaya Films. Zakariya and Muhsin Parari along with cinematographer Ajay Menon and editor Saiju Shreedharan are credited as co-producers under the banner Ourhood Movies. Halal Love Story features an ensemble cast including Indrajith Sukumaran, Joju George, Sharaf U Dheen, Grace Antony in lead roles along with Parvathy Thiruvothu and Soubin Shahir in cameos. The film released on 15 October through Amazon Prime Video. Upon release the film met with mixed reviews.

Plot 
The film starts when Rahim, a member of a Muslim religious organization decides to make a Halal film as the organization see movies as Haram in general. Rahim then meets Shereef, who is an active street play actor for various protests. Both together meet Thoufeeq to ask to write a script for the film. Due to various  limitations, Thoufeeq informs that a telefilm of one hour is better than a full-length feature film. As the organization gives node to the Halal movie, Siraj, is roped as director for the film. Siraj is described as enough mainstream by Thoufeeq, since he drinks and doesn't follows the religion strictly.

Actors are chosen from the organization, but extensive search were conducted for the lead pair. A real husband and wife is required for the lead as mixing for non-married adults can lead to the forbidden region. After the directions from leaders of the organization, wife of Shereef, Suhra agrees to take role of the heroine. And Shereef is also chosen as the hero. As the shooting starts, amateurish performance of actors leads to the sudden halt to shooting. Haseena, a casting director came into the scene and she gives basic acting training to the aspiring actors. In the training session Suhra revealed about a lie Shereef told about her father when he died. Shereef hears this and he becomes defensive. At the end of the session, only six people - including Suhra is chosen for the film. Since Suhra is selected, Shereef also gets selection as the film requires real life husband and wife.

As shooting progresses, Siraj finds that there is something wrong with Suhra and Shereef. He tells this to Thoufeeq and he rewrites the script to make amends between Suhra and Shereef. But things didn't go as planned and Siraj becomes angry. He announces that Shereef needs to reconcile with Suhra in order to continue the filming. As the ice melts, Siraj plans an additional shot for climax in which Suhra and Shereef hugs. But Thoufeeq is against this as he fears that the community may find this as not halal. At last the cinematographer says he know a way and the climax shooting starts. As Suhra and Shereef hugs, Thoufeeq comes into scene and says to stop the shooting. Cinematographer informs him that halal cut is already done. Siraj is also happy as the problems between Shereef and Suhra is also over. The film ends as Rahim and family performs Salah while the movie is running in the TV.

Cast 

 Indrajith Sukumaran as Shereef
 Joju George as Siraj
 Sharaf U Dheen as Thoufeeq
Grace Antony as Suhra
 Abhiram Pothuval as Abhi
 Nazar Karutheny as Rahim
 Zeenath as Rahim's wife
 Assif Yogi as Cinematographer
 Unnimaya Prasad as Siraj's Wife
 Navas Vallikkunnu as Divorce Lawyer
 Nilambur Ayisha as actress in telefilm
 Neeraja Rajendran as Thoufeeq's mother
 Shiny Sarah 
 Ann Saleem
 Sidheek Kodiyathur
 Saheer Mohammed
 Banna Chennamangallur
 Ameen Jawhar
Mamukkoya as Abukka (cameo)
Soubin Shahir as Azad (cameo)
Parvathy Thiruvothu as Haseena (cameo)
Binu Pappu as Abukka's friend (cameo)

Music 
The film features songs composed by Shahabaz Aman and Bijibal with  music produced by Rex Vijayan. The film score is composed by Yakzan Gary Pereira and Neha Nair. Lyrics were penned by Muhsin Parari and Anwar Ali. Additional Music Production is done by Palee Francis. Shahabaz Aman won the Kerala State Film Award for Best Singer for the rendition of the song "Sundaranayavane".

Release 
The film released on 15 October on Amazon Prime Video. Baradwaj Rangan of Film Companion South wrote:

Accolades

References

External links 
 

2020s Malayalam-language films
Indian comedy-drama films
2020 comedy-drama films
Films not released in theaters due to the COVID-19 pandemic
Films scored by Bijibal
Films scored by Shahabaz Aman
2020 direct-to-video films
Amazon Prime Video original films